The Crooked Circle is a 1957 American drama film directed by Joseph Kane. The film was released in the wide-screen  Naturama process by Republic Pictures.

Plot
Before a boxer dies in an accident, he mentions that he should "get lost like Joe Kelly" to sportswriter Ken Cooper. Now curious what became of Kelly, a former contender, Cooper locates him in a remote town where Joe runs a fishing lodge with his brother, Tommy.

Carol Smith, girlfriend of Tommy, immediately urges Cooper to help Tommy get into boxing. Joe is adamantly opposed to this, causing friction between the brothers. Joe finally relents, warning Tommy to change his name and avoid a criminal element.

Al Taylor, an honest trainer, handles the promising Tommy at first, until corrupt manager Larry Ellis, arena owner Max Maxwell and gambler Sam Lattimer sink their hooks into the kid. Tommy begins winning fights and making enough money to buy Carol an expensive engagement ring. He becomes disillusioned only after being told that all his fights were fixed, and that he is expected to deliberately lose the next.

Cooper helps the police expose the racket. When one crook double-crosses another, Lattimer loses $60,000 betting on Tommy to lose. His thugs beat up Joe and kidnap Tommy, preparing to kill him until Cooper and the cops arrive. Cooper's exposé in the newspaper clears Tommy's name, freeing him to marry Carol.

Cast
John Smith as Tommy Kelly 
Fay Spain as Carol Smith 
Steve Brodie as Ken Cooper 	
Don Kelly as Joe Kelly 	
Robert Armstrong as Al Taylor
John Doucette as Larry Ellis
Philip Van Zandt as Max Maxwell
Richard Karlan as Sam Lattimer
Robert Swan as Carl (credited as Bob Swan)
Don Haggerty as Adams
Peter Mamakos as Nick
Charles Sullivan as Bit Role (uncredited)
Ben Welden as Ring Announcer (uncredited)

External links

The Crooked Circle, at Turner Classic Movies (TCM)
The Crooked Circle (1957) at Torrent Butler

1957 films
1957 drama films
1950s English-language films
American drama films
Films directed by Joseph Kane
1950s American films